Razmik or Razmig is an Armenian male name meaning "warrior" that can refer to:

Razmik Amyan (1982), Armenian singer
Razmik Davoyan (1940), Armenian poet
Razmik Grigoryan (footballer) (1971), Armenian former football midfielder
Razmik Grigoryan (1985), Armenian filmmaker
Razmik Martirosyan (1959), Armenian politician
Razmik Mouradian (1938), Russian-Armenian sculptor
Razmik Panossian (1964), Canadian-Armenian political scientist
Razmik Tonoyan (1988), Ukrainian sambist
Razmig Hovaghimian, Armenian-American entrepreneur
Razmig Mavlian, Canadian-Armenian video game developer